The Bank of America Atlanta Football Classic was an annual football classic game between two historically black colleges and universities. The game has since been replaced by the Celebration Bowl HBCU championship game.

History 
The game has been played annually in Atlanta, for its first three years at Grant Field, and at the Georgia Dome since 1992.

Coverage
Versus/NBCSN broadcast the game from 2008 to 2012. Because the two participants in the 2013 and 2014 contests are both part of the Mid-Eastern Athletic Conference, to which ESPN held broadcast rights, ESPN broadcast the game on its online outlet, ESPN3.

Game results

Records

See also
List of black college football classics

References

External links
 

Sports and historically black universities and colleges in the United States
American football competitions in Atlanta
1989 establishments in Georgia (U.S. state)
2014 disestablishments in Georgia (U.S. state)
Black college football classics
Recurring sporting events established in 1989
Recurring sporting events disestablished in 2014
College sports in Georgia (U.S. state)